Macna coelocrossa is a species of snout moth in the genus Macna. It was described by Alfred Jefferis Turner in 1911. It is found in Australia.

References

Moths described in 1911
Pyralini